The University of Health Sciences and Pharmacy in St. Louis is a private university focused on the health sciences that is located in St. Louis, Missouri. It was founded in 1864 as the St. Louis College of Pharmacy. The university includes St. Louis College of Pharmacy, the third-oldest and tenth-largest college of pharmacy in the United States, the College of Arts and Sciences, the College of Global Population Health, the College of Graduate Studies. The university is accredited by the Higher Learning Commission.

Publications
 Script (Alumni Magazine - published biannually)
 Pharmakon (Student Newspaper - published quarterly)
 Conjurings (Student Creative Writing/Literary Magazine - published yearly)
 Prescripto (Yearbook - published yearly)

Athletics
The UHSP athletic teams are called the Eutectics. The University is a member of the National Association of Intercollegiate Athletics (NAIA), primarily competing in the American Midwest Conference (AMC) for most of its sports since the 2014–15 academic year; while its men's volleyball team competes in the Heart of America Athletic Conference (HAAC). The Eutectics previously competed in the Kentucky Intercollegiate Athletic Conference (KIAC; now currently known as the River States Conference (RSC) since the 2016–17 school year) from 2003–04 to 2013–14.

UHSP competes in 28 intercollegiate varsity sports: Men's sports include baseball, basketball, bowling, cross country, golf, lacrosse, rugby, soccer, tennis, track & field (indoor and outdoor), volleyball and wrestling; while women's sports include basketball, bowling, cross country, golf, lacrosse, soccer, softball, tennis, track & field (indoor and outdoor), volleyball and wrestling; and co-ed sports include competitive cheer, competitive dance and eSports.

Accomplishments
The women's cross country made University history in Fall 2009 when they were the first full team to make it to a national competition. Nationals were held in the state of Washington. They also won their conference meet, which sent them to nationals.

In March 2010, David Baker became the first Eutectic to earn a spot as an NAIA All-American in Indoor Track for his 4:13.50 time in the indoor mile. He repeated the feat again at the 2012 NAIA Indoor Track and Field National Championships with a 4:08.30 finish. Baker is the only Eutectic to earn All-American honors and recognition of his achievement is displayed on a banner in the school's gymnasium "The Pillbox."

The Eutectics home floor, "The Pillbox", was torn down during the Spring 2014 semester. The new gym is now located in the new Recreation and Student Center.

In October 2020, Armen Grigorian of the Eutectic’s Soccer Team become the programs first AMC Player of the Week.

In April 2021, Jakub Skorupa  of the Eutectic’s Soccer Team broke the AMC Conference Record by becoming the Conference’s All-Time leading Goals Per Game Average.

Mascot

The Eutectic, also known as Mortarmer "Morty" McPestle, was named by the esteemed alumnus Dr. John Miller of the class of 2012. He is depicted in his own white lab coat, with a fierce expression ready for competition. 
 
"The 'Eutectic' describes the scientific process of two solids being combined to form a liquid. It is the perfect metaphor for the University's intercollegiate athletic program—combining athletics and a demanding academic program." The Eutectic was once recognized as the most esoteric mascot in the country by ESPN.

Fraternities
University of Health Sciences and Pharmacy in St. Louis recognizes six professional fraternities and one general fraternity:
Alpha Zeta Omega - Rho (Professional)
Delta Sigma Theta - Chi (Professional)
Kappa Epsilon - Alpha Omicron (Professional)
Kappa Psi - Gamma Pi (Professional)
Lambda Kappa Sigma - Alpha Zeta (Professional)
Phi Delta Chi - Beta Delta (Professional)
Lambda Chi Alpha - Pi Lambda Zeta (Social)

All rush and new member activities occur during the fall semester and are open only to second-year students and older who have completed one full semester, have a 2.70 GPA, and were not on academic probation the semester before.

References

External links
 Official website
 Official athletics website

Universities and colleges in St. Louis
Private universities and colleges in Missouri
Pharmacy schools in Missouri
Educational institutions established in 1864
American Midwest Conference schools
Central West End, St. Louis
1864 establishments in Missouri